Callum Wilson (born 1992) is an English international footballer.

Callum Wilson may also refer to:

Callum Wilson (Australian footballer) (born 1988)
 (born 1990), English rugby union player
Callum Wilson (footballer, born 1999), Scottish footballer
Callum Wilson (footballer, born 2004), Northern Irish footballer

See also
Cal Wilson (born 1970), New Zealand comedian